The 1990 Kangaroo Tour was the seventeenth Kangaroo Tour, where the Australian national rugby league team (known as the  XXXX Kangaroos due to sponsorship reasons) travelled to Europe and played eighteen matches against British and French club and representative rugby league teams, in addition to three Test matches against Great Britain and two Tests against the French. It followed the tour of 1986 and the next was staged in 1994.

This series was the closest the British team came to reclaiming The Ashes since last winning in Australia in 1970. Great Britain won the first Test at Wembley Stadium and in the second Test at Old Trafford in Manchester the match was tied at 10-all until the final minutes when Australia scored a late try to win the game. Australia then went on to easily win the third and deciding Test and retain The Ashes. Australia won both Test series against Great Britain and France, suffering one loss (against Great Britain in the first Test), and remaining undefeated in tour matches against British clubs in a streak stretching back to midway through the 1978 tour.

The 17th Kangaroo tour was televised back to Australia on the Ten Network with commentary provided by Graeme Hughes and David Morrow. Also joining the commentary team at various stages, including the second Ashes Test at Old Trafford, were then Manly-Warringah coach and former New Zealand national rugby league team coach Graham Lowe, and the captain of 1986 Kangaroos, Wally Lewis. The Channel 10 coverage was sponsored by Just Jeans. The ABC televised the tests against France with Warren Boland providing commentary.

The squad's leadership 
The team was coached by Bob Fulton making his third Kangaroo Tour, though his first as coach (Fulton had captained the Kangaroos on his previous tour as a player in 1978). Mal Meninga was making a record third consecutive tour and his first as captain, while NSW captain Benny Elias (making his second tour) was named as the tours vice-captain. As per custom, the Australian Rugby League appointed two tour managers, one each from the Queensland and New South Wales rugby leagues. Former Kangaroo captain Keith Barnes was team manager from NSW, while Les Stokes was the manager from Qld.

Other staff included trainers Shaun McRae (who also acted as Fulton's assistant coach), Brian "The Sheriff" Hollis, and World Champion boxing trainer Johnny Lewis as team conditioner. Manly-Warringah club doctor Nathan Gibbs, a former South Sydney and Parramatta forward who had retired from playing in 1984 to concentrate on his medical studies, was team doctor. Gibbs made the controversial decision during the selection medicals to rule Kangaroo stalwart and likely captain Wally Lewis unfit for the tour and thus unable to make a third consecutive tour alongside Meninga.

Touring squad 

|- style="background:#ccf;"
| Player
| Club
| Position(s)
| Tests
| Games
| Tries
| Goals
| F/Goals
| Points
|- style="background:#fff;"
| Greg Alexander
|  Penrith Panthers
| 
| 4
| 17
| 14
| 50
| –
| 156
|- style="background:#fff;"
| Gary Belcher
|  Canberra Raiders
| 
| 5
| 11
| 6
| 1
| 1
| 27
|- style="background:#fff;"
| Martin Bella
|  Manly-Warringah Sea Eagles
| 
| 1
| 11
| –
| –
| –
| 0
|- style="background:#fff;"
| Mark Carroll
|  South Sydney Rabbitohs
| 
| 0
| 6
| 2
| –
| –
| 8
|- style="background:#fff;"
| John Cartwright
|  Penrith Panthers
| 
| 1
| 9
| 1
| –
| –
| 4
|- style="background:#fff;"
| Laurie Daley
|  Canberra Raiders
| 
| 3
| 6
| –
| –
| –
| 0
|- style="background:#fff;"
| Ben Elias (vc)
|  Balmain Tigers
| 
| 4
| 10
| 2
| –
| –
| 8
|- style="background:#fff;"
| Andrew Ettingshausen
|  Cronulla-Sutherland Sharks
| 
| 5
| 12
| 15
| –
| –
| 60
|- style="background:#fff;"
| Brad Fittler
|  Penrith Panthers
| 
| 0
| 8
| 8
| –
| –
| 32
|- style="background:#fff;"
| Mark Geyer
|  Penrith Panthers
| 
| 1
| 11
| 4
| –
| –
| 16
|- style="background:#fff;"
| David Gillespie
|  Canterbury-Bankstown Bulldogs
| 
| 3
| 10
| 1
| –
| –
| 4
|- style="background:#fff;"
| Michael Hancock
|  Brisbane Broncos
| 
| 1
| 6
| 4
| –
| –
| 16
|- style="background:#fff;"
| Des Hasler
|  Manly-Warringah Sea Eagles
| 
| 4
| 13
| 3
| –
| –
| 12
|- style="background:#fff;"
| Chris Johns
|  Brisbane Broncos
| 
| 1
| 11
| 4
| –
| –
| 16
|- style="background:#fff;"
| Allan Langer
|  Brisbane Broncos
| 
| 1
| 11
| 4
| –
| –
| 16
|- style="background:#fff;"
| Glenn Lazarus
|  Canberra Raiders
| 
| 5
| 13
| 2
| –
| –
| 8
|- style="background:#fff;"
| Bob Lindner
|  Western Suburbs Magpies
| 
| 4
| 10
| 2
| –
| –
| 8
|- style="background:#fff;"
| Cliff Lyons
|  Manly-Warringah Sea Eagles
| 
| 4
| 8
| 3
| –
| –
| 12
|- style="background:#fff;"
| Brad Mackay
|  St George Dragons
| 
| 4
| 12
| 4
| –
| –
| 16
|- style="background:#fff;"
| Mal Meninga (c)
|  Canberra Raiders
| 
| 5
| 11
| 8
| 16
| –
| 64
|- style="background:#fff;"
| Mark McGaw
|  Cronulla-Sutherland Sharks
| 
| 1
| 6
| 1
| –
| –
| 4
|- style="background:#fff;"
| Steve Roach
|  Balmain Tigers
| 
| 5
| 10
| 2
| –
| –
| 8
|- style="background:#fff;"
| Mark Sargent
|  Newcastle Knights
| 
| 3
| 11
| 6
| 1
| –
| 25
|- style="background:#fff;"
| Dale Shearer
|  Brisbane Broncos
| 
| 5
|13
| 9
| 1
| –
| 38
|- style="background:#fff;"
| Paul Sironen
|  Balmain Tigers
| 
| 5
| 10
| 3
| –
| –
| 12
|- style="background:#fff;"
| Ricky Stuart
|  Canberra Raiders
| 
| 5
| 9
| 1
| –
| –
| 5
|- style="background:#fff;"
| Kerrod Walters
|  Brisbane Broncos
| 
| 1
| 8
| 2
| –
| –
| 8
|- style="background:#fff;"
| Kevin Walters
|  Brisbane Broncos
| 
| 0
| 8
| 5
| –
| –
| 20
|-

By club 
The touring side was represented by 18 New South Welshmen (N) and 10 Queenslanders (Q).

 Brisbane Broncos (6): Michael Hancock (Q), Chris Johns (N), Allan Langer (Q), Dale Shearer (Q), Kerrod Walters (Q), Kevin Walters (Q)
 Canberra Raiders (5): Mal Meninga (captain) (Q), Gary Belcher (Q), Laurie Daley (N), Glenn Lazarus (N), Ricky Stuart (N)
 Penrith Panthers (4): Greg Alexander (N), John Cartwright (N), Brad Fittler (N), Mark Geyer (N),
 Balmain Tigers (3): Ben Elias (vice-captain) (N), Steve Roach (N), Paul Sironen (N)
 Manly-Warringah Sea Eagles (3): Martin Bella (Q), Des Hasler (N), Cliff Lyons (N)
 Cronulla Sutherland Sharks (2): Andrew Ettingshausen (N), Mark McGaw (N)
 Canterbury-Bankstown Bulldogs (1): David Gillespie (N)
 Newcastle Knights (1): Mark Sargent (N)
 South Sydney Rabbitohs (1): Mark Carroll (N)
 St George Dragons (1): Brad Mackay
 Western Suburbs Magpies (1): Bob Lindner (Q)

Mal Meninga was making his third Kangaroo Tour having also toured in 1982 and 1986. Greg Alexander, Gary Belcher, Martin Bella, Ben Elias, Des Hasler, Bob Lindner, Steve Roach, Dale Shearer and Paul Sironen were all 1986 tourists. For the rest of the squad it was their first ever Kangaroo Tour.

The Kangaroos went away with four club halfbacks in the squad. Test incumbent Allan Langer; Canberra's former Wallaby and dual premiership winning half Ricky Stuart; and former test halfbacks Des Hasler and Greg Alexander – though Hasler's ability to play almost anywhere in the backline as well as the back row, saw him as the team's utility player while Alexander would play most of the tour as backup fullback to Gary Belcher, with two games on the wing : one against Widnes, the final tour game on the English leg; the other the second Test against France, the final game of the tour (he had also played most of the game against Castleford on the wing after replacing the injured Mark McGaw). Like Terry Lamb in 1986, Alexander was selected for every game on the tour, though unlike Lamb he did not appear in each game after not getting off the bench in the Wigan game or in the second Ashes Test.

Great Britain 
The Ashes series against Great Britain saw a record aggregate crowd of 133,684 attending the Test series, easily beating the previous record of 114,883 set during the 1948–49 Kangaroo tour and was some 66,130 more than had attended the 1988 Ashes series in Australia. As with the 1982 and 1986 tours, the game against Wigan at Central Park drew the biggest club game attendance of the Kangaroo Tour with a crowd of 24,814.

The tour took place during the 1990–91 Rugby Football League season. Bradford Northern were left off the tour itinerary after being fined by the RFL for fielding what was virtually a reserve grade side against the touring New Zealand team in 1989.

Of the 13 games the Kangaroos played in England, four of the teams (Wigan, Warrington, Castleford and Hull) were coached by Australian's while one other (St Helens) was coached by a New Zealander.

Test Venues 
The three Ashes series tests took place at the following venues.

Kangaroos skipper Mal Meninga, a crowd favourite at St Helens after playing with the club in 1984–85 and helping them to win the Premiership and Lancashire Cup, returned to Knowsley Road and scored two tries, including the opening try of the tour. Andrew Ettingshausen came into the side on the wing in place of Dale Shearer who was ruled out with a stomach muscle strain, and crossed for a hat-trick of tries.

Referee Kevin Allatt sent 4 players off during this game and sin binned 3 others. Sent off were John Thompson (WT), Mark Carroll (Aus), Ricky Stuart (Aus) and David Gillespie (Aus) who was actually sent off for back chatting the referee after the game had finished. Billy Conway (WT), Des Hasler and Dale Shearer (Aus) were also sent to the sin-bin during the game. In a media interview after the game, Australian coach Bob Fulton said it was something like out of Fawlty Towers and that he couldn't believe that the referee lost control. Fulton also added that the referee had told him before the game that he was 48 years old, causing the Australian coach to think that he should have been home in front of a warm fire with a cup of tea rather than refereeing a professional game of football.

In English club football at the time, players sent-off during a match were required to face the RFL judiciary, including those from touring international teams. All three Kangaroos, Carroll, Stuart and Gillespie, escaped suspension from the league who agreed that the send-offs were enough punishment under the circumstances.

Penrith's Brad Fittler, who was aged 18 years and 247 days on the day of the game and just 12 months earlier had been a member of the Australian Schoolboys side, played in the centres and officially became the youngest ever Kangaroo tourist.

The match against English power club Wigan was generally regarded as the Kangaroos "4th Test" in England. However, as the team had done a week earlier against St Helens, the Kangaroos won the match easily with Wigan's only score coming from a first half penalty try to Shaun Edwards who was illegally pulled down in a chase to the ball by Bob Lindner (had Edwards not been awarded the try it would have still been scored anyway as Wigan winger David Myers had beaten everyone to ground the ball in the in-goal). Joe Lydon converted and Wigan led 6–0, but from there the Kangaroos took control of the game. Two tries to Ettingshausen and singles to Michael Hancock and man of the match Gary Belcher saw the Kangaroos race to a 20–6 lead at half time. And hopes of a Wigan comeback were snuffed out early in the second half when Ettingshausen crossed for his second hat-trick of the tour in just two games. Further tries to Brad Mackay and Alfie Langer pushed the final score out to 34–6 (Australia's highest ever score against the Cherry and Whites) and only Mal Meninga's continued poor goal kicking (3/7 here to follow his 1/6 against St Helens) kept the score from being even greater.

Other than the second Ashes Test where he didn't get off the bench during the game, this was the only game on tour that Greg Alexander did not take the field. He was the only one of the 4 man reserves bench not to be used by coach Fulton.

The match against Cumbria in Workington was the 1990 Kangaroos only game against an English county team and was played in light rain. Playing at lock forward, Des Hasler was the official Man of the Match while Dale Shearer signaled his intentions with a hat trick of tries. For the Cumbrians, Barrow halfback and team captain Dean Marwood was their best player using a clever kicking game to continually turn the Kangaroos defence around.

During the game against Leeds at Headingley, the home side led the Kangaroos 10–6 at half time thanks to tries from former All Blacks fullback John Gallagher and Great Britain forward Paul Dixon who was awarded a try after what appeared to be a Leeds knock-on. This was the first time since Hull F.C. led the Kangaroos 7–0 at The Boulevard during game 12 of the 1982 Kangaroo tour that a British team (club, county or test) had led the tourists at half time of a match. An all-in brawl in the first half left Australian five-eight Laurie Daley with a broken bone in his right hand leaving him in doubt for the upcoming first test at Wembley Stadium

The Ashes series 
After heavy criticism of French referee Alain Sablayrolles (who could not speak English), this would be the final time an Ashes series was refereed by a Frenchman. From the 1992 series referees would be from either Australia, Britain or New Zealand.

First Test 
In the first rugby league international played at Wembley for 17 years, Ellery Hanley inspired a stirring first Test win for the Lions in front of 54,569 fans, the largest ever Test attendance in England and breaking the record of 50,583 set at Old Trafford in the first Ashes Test of the 1990 Kangaroo tour.

Lions coach Mal Reilly named the expected side, as did Bob Fulton. Stuart's selection saw him become the 38th Australian dual-rugby international having previously played for The Wallabies (Australian rugby union team) during their 1987 tour of Argentina. Although not selected for the test, Kangaroos forward Mark Carroll suffered a knee injury during the team's first training session in London at the Crystal Palace ground, the home of London's only professional league club of the time Fulham. The injury required Carroll to undergo an arthroscopy which would see him not return to the field until the game against Hull F.C. three weeks later.

Immediately after the kickoff, the Kangaroos got a taste of test football in England when Martin Bella received the ball for the first hit up. The Lions, knowing they were kicking off and that Australia were to handle the ball first, had coated the ball with petroleum jelly to make it extra slippery and Bella dropped the ball in the opening tackle (during the stop in play the British trainer came onto the field with a towel for Andy Gregory to wipe the jelly from the ball before he fed the scrum). Lions players also came in for criticism as a number were seen to have the jelly smeared on their legs to make them harder to tackle. The Lions soon opened the scoring after Bob Lindner had been tackled and had then played the ball forward. Sablayrolles ruled that Lindner had a marker and a nervous Paul Eastwood kicked a penalty goal that bounced in off the posts. Eastwood's next kick about 15 minutes later also hit the posts but this time bounced back into play, though luckily for Australia Lindner was in place to take the ball and prevent the Lions from scoring a try.

The Kangaroos were having difficulty with the French referee's interpretations (the penalty count would eventually favour the home side 17–7), but although the Lions enjoyed the bulk of possession, the Aussie's managed to weather the storm and at half time the score was locked at 2–all. Ellery Hanley and Garry Schofield's tactic of kicking over the Kangaroos defensive line rather than having their forwards trying to bash their way through it was proving to be a problem.

Despite a brilliant individual try in the second half to Mark McGaw after Steve Hampson and Carl Gibson had collided while attempting to tackle him, and a try to Mal Meninga, the Aussies were in trouble all day. The Lions, led by Hanley and Schofield were playing better than expected and after second half tries to Martin Offiah following a dropped bomb by Belcher in front of the posts (the Australian fullback had been hit in a perfectly timed tackle by Hanley who chased his own kick and caused Belcher to spill the ball straight into the arms of the waiting Offiah), a double to Eastwood who scored the winning try and a field goal by Schofield saw the Lions take a famous 19–12 win. After also winning the final game of the 1988 series in Sydney, this was Great Britain's second straight win over Australia and ended any hopes that the 1990 Tour would emulate the unbeaten 1982 and 1986 Kangaroo tours.

Despite this being a midweek match just four days after the test at Wembley, Mal Meninga played the game against Warrington at his own request. Former Great Britain captain Mike Gregory made his return from injury for the home side. The Aussies aura of invincibility had been broken by the first test loss at Wembley, giving hope to not only the Lions test side but also the rest of the club sides waiting to play the Kangaroos and the scoreline was generally believed to have flattered the Kangaroos. It wasn't until late in the game that they put it out of Warrington's reach.

The Kangaroos played with the expected second test lineup. Dale Shearer had replaced Michael Hancock on the wing. Cliff Lyons came in at 5/8 with Ricky Stuart moved to halfback at the expense of Allan Langer who played this game from the bench (he came on to replace Stuart with only 8 minutes remaining). Glenn Lazarus replaced Martin Bella in the front row (Bella also played from the bench) while Brad Mackay came in at lock with Bob Lindner moved to the second row in place of John Cartwright (again on the bench). Mark McGaw's tour ended just 20 minutes into the game after rupturing the Medial ligament in his right knee. Unfortunately the injury occurred when his knee came into accidental contact with the head of Glenn Lazarus while the pair were tackling Castleford pivot Graham Steadman (who also banged his knee with McGaw's, though without injury). For his part, Lazarus required 17 stitches to bad gash above his left eye and would not take any further part, replaced by the man who had seemingly lost his place to the dual Canberra premiership winning prop, Martin Bella.

Midway through the second half, Castleford's Australian coach Darryl van der Velde defused a potentially volatile situation by replacing Lee Crooks who had begun to be involved in a number of flare-ups with Kangaroos front rower Steve Roach. Prior to coming off, veteran Crooks who had made his test debut for Great Britain as a teenager against the 1982 Kangaroos, was arguably Castleford's best player on the day.

Halifax were the only 2nd Division team the Kangaroos faced in 1990 and were out to prove their worth. However, as per normal for the English club sides on the tour, after 15 minutes their intensity dropped and by halftime the Kangaroos had cruised to a 32–6 lead. With both Mal Meninga and Ben Elias not playing and expected to be named in the second test team, Bob Fulton handed the captaincy for the game to Allan Langer. Mark Geyer got the ball rolling with the opening try after Halifax fullback Steve Smith spilled a Greg Alexander bomb behind his posts. From there tries to Mark Sargent, Alexander, Kevin Walters and a double to Chris Johns saw the Kangaroos shoot away with Australian centre Greg Austin scoring the only try for the home side. In an unsavory incident, as he crossed for a try just after the half-time siren, Kevin Walters was hit on the head by a coin thrown from the crowd.

Halifax out-scored the Kangaroos 12–4 in the second half, aided no end by referee Brian Galtress who handed the home side some 10 penalties to just 2 to the Kangaroos in the half (Halifax won the penalty count 15–6 and according to media reports, Halifax coach Peter Roe was seen having harsh words with the referee at half time). Galtress also disallowed 3 seemingly fair tries to the Australians in the second half, including one to Dale Shearer who was ruled offside from a Kevin Walters kick although television replays indicated that Shearer had been about one metre behind Walters.

Soon after scoring Australia's last try of the night midway through the second half, test winger Michael Hancock suffered an ankle injury which forced him from the field. It would cost him what slim chance he had of keeping his place in the side for the upcoming second test with Brisbane teammate Dale Shearer ultimately re-claiming his place on the Australian test wing.

Second Test 
Bob Fulton made a number of changes from the first test loss at Wembley. Dale Shearer returned to the wing in place of Michael Hancock. A knee injury against Castleford when his knee had collided with the head of teammate Glenn Lazarus (who suffered a bad cut requiring 17 stitches) had ended centre Mark McGaw's tour with Laurie Daley returning to the test team to partner Meninga in the centres despite having a broken bone in his right hand. Cliff Lyons, who had won a premiership with Manly under Fulton in 1987, was called up to make his test debut with Ricky Stuart moving to halfback in place of Allan Langer. Others coming into the side were Benny Elias (hooker) for his first test since the 1988 World Cup Final, Glenn Lazarus in the front row and playing in headgear to protect the stitches, while Brad Mackay come in at lock with Bob Lindner moving to the second row at the expense of John Cartwright who dropped to the bench. Mal Reilly stuck with much of the same side that had won the first test, though injury ruled out Bradford's Karl Fairbank with Leeds forward Roy Powell moved to the bench. Wigan's Andy Platt came into the team in the front row and Paul Dixon dropping back to his preferred second row.

After a tense opening during which neither side gained any clear ascendancy, Dale Shearer made a welcome return to test football when he opened the scoring with a try 18 minutes into the first half after good lead-up play by Lyons, Stuart and Daley had left the flyer with a 35-metre run to the line. Meninga missed the conversion and the only other score was a penalty goal to Lions winger Paul Eastwood after Paul Sironen was penalised for giving Denis Betts a 'facial' in a tackle to leave the score 4–2 in Australia's favour.

The Lions hit back early in the second half with a try to Dixon who broke through Shearer's tackle and was able to score after Mal Meninga and Gary Belcher had fallen off him when they collided with each other. Eastwood hooked the conversion attempt and the Lions led 6–4. Soon after Lions winger Martin Offiah went down with a leg injury and he was replaced by Paul Loughlin which saw Carl Gibson forced out to the wing.

Australia reclaimed the lead thanks to a brilliant team try to Cliff Lyons in his test debut. The ball passed through 12 sets of hands (with Lyons handling it 3 times in the movement) with the Kangaroos refusing to let the ball die before Stuart and Meninga got the ball to Andrew Ettingshausen who raced down the right wing and centre kicked for Lyons to regather and score beside the posts with Garry Schofield clinging to his waist, giving the Kangaroos a 10–6 lead after Meninga landed the conversion.

With just ten minutes left, Great Britain were poised to reclaim The Ashes after twenty years with an intercept try by replacement centre Loughlin late in the match. Ricky Stuart had aimed a pass to Meninga, but Loughlin (called a Giraffe by Bob Fulton) intercepted it on the half way and raced 50 metres to score, though he was kept out wide due to a converging Laurie Daley. After hooking his earlier conversion attempt from almost the same position, Eastwood then asked noted right foot goal kicker Loughlin if he wanted to take the kick, but the St. Helens centre declined. The Hull F.C. winger then sliced the pressure conversion attempt to the left of the posts. Had the kick been successful it would have given the Lions a 12–10 lead with time running out.

However the match remained tied at 10–all and after a Garry Schofield touch finder with less than 3 minutes remaining, Great Britain had the Kangaroos pinned only 10 metres out from their own line. After struggling to make ground following the scrum win, on the 4th tackle Ricky Stuart dummied past an exhausted Lee Jackson and ran 75 metres downfield leaving Lions players (including Ellery Hanley) in his wake before passing to Mal Meninga in support (who legally shouldered Carl Gibson out of the way) to complete a length-of-the-field try that sealed the match for Australia and force the series into a decider. Meninga (who had admitted that he had not been happy with his goal kicking on the tour) missed the conversion of his own try, but it wasn't a factor as the siren sounded to end the match seconds after the kick.

After a number of tours where the Kangaroos played at least two games in the north-eastern British seaside city, this would be the only game of the tour that the Australian's played in Hull. Although Australian Brian Smith was still officially the Hull coach at this time, his assistant Noel Cleal (a member of the 1986 Kangaroos and a premiership winner with Manly-Warringah under Bob Fulton in 1987) was given the coaching duties for the game. Cleal would take over as Hull coach at the end of the season when Smith moved back to Sydney to coach St George and at the time of this game, Hull were on top of the RFL premiership ladder. In a post match interview, Cleal admitted that he was sitting on the fence in this game. As coach of Hull he wanted his side to win, but he also admitted that it was pleasing to see Australia playing so well with the Ashes decider to be played in 10 days time. Giant forward Mark Carroll returned to the side after suffering a knee injury during a team training session a few days before the first Ashes Test some 3 weeks earlier.

The game against Widnes was shrouded in controversy. Midway through the second half Paul Sironen was taken from the field with an eye injury and Kangaroos team doctor Nathan Gibbs diagnosed a scratched retina. During the game, Australian captain Mal Meninga had reluctantly made a complaint to referee John Kedrew about Australian players being poked in the eyes when being tackled, as had happened to Sironen (the alleged culprit was Widnes captain Kurt Sorensen who later denied any deliberate wrongdoing). Kangaroos team management and coach Bob Fulton were furious about the incident after the game, although the matter went no further due to a lack of any conclusive video evidence. The injury put Sironen in doubt for the up-coming third and deciding Ashes test in Leeds.

The game against the reigning World Club champions was a tight one on what proved to be the coldest day of the tour in England. Led by their inspirational 'Welsh Wizard' fullback, dual rugby international Jonathan Davies, Widnes pushed the Kangaroos to the closest club game score of the tour with the Kangaroos finally winning 15–8 thanks to tries to man of the match Gary Belcher (who also kicked a goal after Meninga had missed with his 3 attempts as well as adding the tour's only field goal), Dale Shearer and Greg Alexander. "Brandy" played the game at Naughton Park, the scene of Australia's last non-test loss in England back in 1978, on the wing with Shearer moved to the centres in place of Laurie Daley who was being kept under wraps until the third test due to his broken right hand.

Third Test 
In the third and final test of The Ashes series, Australia kept alive their series streak (not having lost The Ashes since Great Britain won in Australia in 1970 and not having lost them in England since 1959), with a 14–0 win in front of a packed Elland Road in Leeds. Australia ran in three tries to nil with Mal Meninga, Andrew Ettingshausen and Benny Elias all crossing the line while the Lions rarely threatened the Kangaroos line in the wet and slippery conditions.

Kangaroos captain Mal Meninga became just the third Australian to score a try in each test of an Ashes series following on from legendary try-scoring winger Ken Irvine in 1962 and 1963, and the most unlikely of the trio, front-row forward Sam Backo in 1988.

Bob Fulton made only one change to his side from Old Trafford with David Gillespie coming onto the bench for John Cartwright. Mal Reilly did similar to his former Manly-Warringah teammate and only made changes to his bench with Jonathan Davies replacing Paul Loughlin and Mike Gregory returning to the side in place of Shaun Edwards.

This test also doubled as a round game of the 1989–1992 Rugby League World Cup.

The deciding test was played in wet and slippery conditions, though the Kangaroos handled the tricky conditions better than the home side.

Australia's first try to Andrew Ettingshausen came when the Kangaroos caught the Lions short in their defensive line. Centre Carl Gibson had received a head knock and was in the hands of the trainers. Unfortunately he was still on the field which did not allow his replacement Jonathan Davies to come on and make up the numbers. Stuart's long pass to Ettingshausen allowed him to skirt around Martin Offiah to score in the corner for the only points of the first half after Meninga missed the difficult sideline conversion.

Later in the second half, Meninga scored after Garry Schofield had raced out the Lions defensive line to try for an intercept. However the ball got to Cliff Lyons first and he immediately exploited the gap where Schofield should have been to send Meninga back inside to score untouched under the posts. In the Elland Road grandstand, Lions coach Mal Reilly and his assistant Phil Larder could only look on in disbelief. Schofield, who was nicknamed "The Poacher" due to his habit of racing out of the line looking for intercepts, had been warned before the game by both Reilly and Larder (as well as his own club coach, former Lions captain David Ward) not to race out of the defensive line as the Australians were capable of exploiting any gap it created, which is exactly what happened. Meninga's easy conversion of his own try gave Australia what would be a match winning 10–0 lead in the conditions. With only minutes remaining, Elias put the result beyond doubt when he scooted out of dummy half and scored in the corner to give Australia a well earned 14–0 win.

France 

Australia: Greg Alexander, Dale Shearer, Brad Fittler, Chris Johns, Des Hasler, Kevin Walters, Allan Langer (c), Mark Sargent, Kerrod Walters, Martin Bella, Mark Carroll, Mark Geyer, David Gillespie

Australia: Greg Alexander, Gary Belcher, Brad Fittler, Chris Johns, Des Hasler, Kevin Walters, Allan Langer (c), Mark Sargent, Kerrod Walters, Martin Bella, Mark Carroll, Mark Geyer, David Gillespie

Fullback Greg Alexander (Test fullback Gary Belcher actually played on the wing) had a field day against the French B team in Lyon, crossing for 5 tries and kicking 13 goals from 13 attempts for a personal score of 46 points which saw him become the first player to score over 100 points on the tour (he ended the game with 104 points for the tour).

French Tests

First test 

The Kangaroos easily accounted for a gallant, but out-classed French side in the first test in Avignon. Replacement halfback Greg Alexander, who came on after only 15 minutes of the first half for Ricky Stuart who left the field feeling ill, continued his good form in France and crossed for a hat-trick of tries. He also took over the goal kicking from Mal Meninga and kicked 7/8 giving him a personal points haul of 26 points as the Kangaroos won their 8th straight game against France 60–4.

The only change to the Kangaroos line up from the third test against Great Britain was David Gillespie coming off the bench to replace an injured Bob Lindner, with giant Penrith back row forward Mark Geyer coming onto the bench for his test match debut.

Australia: Greg Alexander, Dale Shearer, Chris Johns, Andrew Ettingshausen, Des Hasler, Brad Fittler, Allan Langer (c), Mark Sargent, Kevin Walters, Martin Bella, Mark Geyer, Mark Carroll, John Cartwright

Second Test 

Against an out-classed French team, Kangaroos coach Bob Fulton allowed himself the luxury of fiddling with the test side for the final game of the tour. Laurie Daley was ruled out with a hamstring injury which saw Dale Shearer move to the centres with Greg Alexander selected to play in the unfamiliar position of wing. Bob Lindner returned to the side which saw David Gillespie move back to the bench while Mark Geyer was also ruled out with injury and was replaced by speedy Brisbane Broncos outside back Chris Johns for his test debut.

After scoring a first half try, Greg Alexander performed a gymnastic backflip (Alexander claimed he had wanted to do that during one of the English games but felt the timing hadn't been right given the circumstances with Australia under pressure due to their first test loss). The Kangaroos won the second test 34–10 against a much more committed French team at the Stade Gilbert Brutus in Perpignan.

Statistics 
Leading try scorer
 15 by Andrew Ettingshausen

Leading point scorer
 156 by Greg Alexander (14 tries, 50 goals)

Largest attendance
 54,569 – First test vs Great Britain at Wembley Stadium

Largest club game attendance
 24,814 – Australia vs Wigan at Central Park

Bob Lindner was named the player's player of the tour.

References

External links 
 1990 Kangaroo Tour of Great Britain and France at rl1908.com
 1990 Kangaroo Tour at rlhalloffame.org.uk

Further reading 
 Andrews, Malcolm (2006) The ABC of Rugby League Austn Broadcasting Corpn, Sydney
 McGregor, Adrian (1991) Simply The Best, The 1990 Kangaroos, Uni of Queensland Press pages 225–225
 Belcher, Gary (1991) Kangaroo Confidential Gary Belcher's Tour Diary, pages 138–150
 Cochrane, Brett & Kerr, James (1991) Twenty Eight Heroes, Cochrane & Kerr, Sydney

Australia national rugby league team tours
Rugby league tours of Great Britain
Rugby league tours of France
Kangaroo tour of Great Britain and France
Kangaroo tour of Great Britain and France
Kangaroo tour of Great Britain and France